The Wirz's goby, Oxuderces wirzi, is a species of goby found in Oceania from Papua New Guinea and northern Australia.

Size

Etymology
The fish is named in honor of  a "Dr. Wirz", who collected the type specimen., probably referring to Swiss anthropologist Paul Wirz (1892-1955).

References

Taxa named by Frederik Petrus Koumans
Fish described in 1937
Oxudercinae